Online segregation is the unintentional segregation of people on the Internet, which is often believed to be a democratizing tool used to bring equality among people. For example, popular social network services such as MySpace and Facebook have been argued to magnify social, political, and class divides that already exist in the real world.

Racial Segregation

White Flight in Networked Publics 
danah boyd, a technology and social media scholar, studied the concept of the white flight in relation to networked publics and examined how race, ethnicity, and socio-economic status impacted teenagers' preference between MySpace and Facebook. This process of self-segregation among social networks was akin to the white flight that took place during the 1950s and 1960s in the United States. During her research, Boyd also found that the people she surveyed often noted that MySpace was seen as "black" and Facebook as "white," along with the term "ghetto" that played a big role in creating spatial and ethnic-based connotations. She also observed that people of a certain race would typically befriend people of the same race, thereby mimicking the self-segregation that also exists in real life.

Impression Management 
A study on respectability politics argues that "modern social media presents new challenges for self-presentation and impression management."  In the media, people are often forced behave according to the White power structure and keep in mind the appropriate rhetoric, context, or style that fits the taste of White people. This accounts for the concept of "imagined audience," where social norms and social context impact the visibility of people—especially that of minorities—online.

See also 
 Segregation (at Wiktionary)
 Racial segregation
 Age segregation
 Occupational segregation
 Echo chamber (media)

References

Racial segregation
Internet culture